Operation Orient  (German: Fall Orient) was the code name given to the operation that envisioned Nazi Germany linking up with the Empire of Japan mainly through the Middle East. Not to be confused with the North African Campaign, which highlighted in Führer-Directive Nr. 32 gave large priority to the capture of Tobruk and ultimately securing North Africa, Operation Orient focused mainly on securing the Middle East and its oil fields and linking up with Japanese forces after the fall of the Soviet Union.

The operation was to be initiated after the capture of the Caucasus, the securing of the territories in North Africa, and after resistance in the Soviet Union had finally been overthrown. German armies would launch attacks from Libya through Egypt, and from Bulgaria through Turkey. Those armies would then link up in the Middle East and then march through Iran and Iraq as an assembled force finally convening in India, where they would seal their final victory over Britain. Defeats at Stalingrad and El Alamein in late 1942 and early 1943, canceled the plan.

See also 
 Case Blue
 Greater East Asia Co-Prosperity Sphere
 Erich Raeder's "Mediterranean plan"

References

1942 in Germany
Battles and operations of the Soviet–German War
North African campaign